Ah, Sweet Mystery of Life: The Country Stories of Roald Dahl is a 1989 short story collection by Roald Dahl. The book is a collection of seven of Dahl's stories published in various magazines and collections in the 1940s and 1950s. Containing much black humour, the book contains sickening and grotesque stories about ratcatching, maggot breeding, poaching, and the mysteries and eccentricities of rural life.

The first story “Ah, Sweet Mystery of Life” talks about the trouble of taking a cow to be mated with a prime bull. Mr Rummins is an expert at helping the mating process, in which he can guarantee the gender of the offspring.

See also
 My Uncle Oswald
 The Collected Short Stories of Roald Dahl

References

1989 short story collections
Short story collections by Roald Dahl
Michael Joseph books